Seeing Things is the first solo studio album by American singer-songwriter Jakob Dylan. The album was released on June 10, 2008, by Columbia Records and was recorded at the Hollywood Hills home of producer Rick Rubin.

Dylan performed songs from the album for a small group on May 8, 2008, at Nissan's Live Sets in Los Angeles, California. Videos of these performances are available for viewing at Jakob Dylan @ Yahoo Music.

Dylan also announced his first solo tour with his band The Gold Mountain Rebels to promote the album beginning May 17, 2008, with appearances on the Late Show with David Letterman on June 11, on The Tonight Show with Jay Leno on July 15, and on The Late Late Show with Craig Ferguson on August 4.

Track listing
All songs written and composed by Jakob Dylan, except "I Told You I Couldn't Stop" composed by Dylan and Matt Sweeney.
"Evil Is Alive and Well" – 3:56
"Valley of the Low Sun" – 3:57
"All Day and All Night" – 3:28
"Everybody Pays as They Go" – 3:00
"Will It Grow" – 4:49
"I Told You I Couldn't Stop" – 4:14
"War Is Kind" – 3:08
"Something Good This Way Comes" – 3:39
"On up the Mountain" – 3:45
"This End of the Telescope" – 3:59
"Costa Rica" (iTunes Bonus Track) – 3:35

Personnel
 Jakob Dylan – bass, guitar, vocals
 Rick Rubin – producer
 Z. Berg – musician
 Mathieu Bitton – art direction, design
 Jason Boesel – musician
 Lindsay Chase – production coordination
 Rich Egan – management
 Jason Lader – engineer, mixing
 Dana Nielsen – engineer
 Vlado Meller – mastering
 James Minchin – photography
 Mark Santangelo – assistant

Charts

Notes

2008 debut albums
Jakob Dylan albums
Albums produced by Rick Rubin
Columbia Records albums
Alternative rock albums by American artists
Folk albums by American artists